1000 Gecs (stylized as 1000 gecs or 1000 gec) is the debut studio album by American hyperpop duo 100 Gecs. It was released on May 31, 2019, through Dog Show Records two days after the single "Money Machine" was released.

Featuring an experimental sound that combined several genres, 1000 Gecs was well-received by critics. It placed on several publications' lists of the best albums of 2019. Remixed and reworked versions of songs from 1000 Gecs were later released as part of the follow-up remix album 1000 Gecs and the Tree of Clues(2020).

Composition
1000 Gecs is a genre-hopping album, generally described by Pitchfork as experimental pop and by Sputnik as bubblegum bass. According to Will Pritchard of The Independent, the album helped to consolidate the eclectic 2010s "hyperpop" style by taking the genre "to its most extreme, and extremely catchy, conclusions: stadium-sized trap beats processed and distorted to near-destruction, overwrought emo vocals and cascades of ravey arpeggios." Some genres used to describe certain songs or parts of the album include post-dubstep, indie pop, pop punk, trance, chiptune, happy hardcore, hip hop, synth-pop, ska, and Europop. The song "xXXi_wud_nvrstøp_ÜXXx" is an interpolation of "Kiss Me Thru the Phone" by Soulja Boy.

Promotion
The song "Money Machine" was released as a single from the album on May 29, 2019, with a visualizer for the song posted to YouTube. The song quickly became the duo's most successful and well known song to date, and on June 13, 2019, an official music video for the song was released. In June 2019, the band released official merchandise for the album on the Dog Show Records website. An official music video for the song "800dB Cloud" was released on July 25, 2019. Over a year later, an official music video for "Hand Crushed by a Mallet" was released on October 9, 2020.

In August 2019, 100 Gecs released the album's instrumentals, stems, and a cappella vocals for free download.

Critical reception

1000 Gecs received generally positive reviews from critics. Larry Fitzmaurice of Pitchfork gave the album a rating of 7.4 out of 10, calling it "one of the year's most fascinating, exhilarating experimental pop albums". Similarly, Fred Thomas at AllMusic described it as being "jittery, ridiculous, and perpetually short-circuiting" but also "a fine-tuned and controlled pop product."

In December 2019, New York Times music critics Jon Caramanica and Jon Pareles  rated 1000 Gecs #1 and #10 respectively in their "Best Albums of 2019" article.

Accolades

Track listing

 All track titles are stylized in all lowercase except "I Need Help Immediately" and "Gec 2 Ü" (stylized as "gec 2 Ü").

Personnel
100 Gecs
 Dylan Brady
 Laura Les

Artwork
 Gabe Howell – photography
 Nic John – photography
 Mikey Joyce – graphic design

Charts

References

External links
 1000 gecs a cappellas, instrumentals, and stems

2019 debut albums
Albums produced by 100 Gecs
100 Gecs albums
Experimental pop albums
Pop albums by American artists
Albums produced by Dylan Brady